Rosa María Juana Martínez Suárez (born 23 February 1927), known by her stage name Mirtha Legrand (″Legrand″ being a portmanteau for the French , "the great") is an Argentine actress and television presenter. With an 80-year career, Legrand is one of the most recognized entertainment figures in Argentina. Despite having appeared in 36 films and 20 theatrical performances, Legrand is best known for her interview television programme Almorzando con las estrellas that first aired in 1968 on Alejandro Romay's channel 9. The show was later renamed Almorzando con Mirtha Legrand.

Early life and career

Legrand was born on 23 February 1927 in Villa Cañás. She and her twin sister Silvia were born to José Martínez, a librarian, and Rosa Suárez, a school teacher. They had a sibling named José Antonio. Their parents were Spanish. When they separated in 1934 Rosa moved to Rosario with her three children, where the Legrand sisters took classes of singing and dancing. In 1936 they moved to the La Paternal neighborhood in Buenos Aires.

Legrand began her career in the carnival of 1939 when she participated in a contest organised by the Diario de Cine programme (Cinema Diary) at Belgrano Radio. She rose to fame in the late 1930s and early 1940s, during the golden era of the Argentine film industry that resembled the Hollywood one. Rosa María's stage name Mirtha Legrand was coined by her agent Roberto Cerebello when she was 14 years old. Legrand's film debut was in Educating Niní, which also had the participation of Niní Marshall and Legrand's sister Silvia.

Personal life
While filming Cinco besos in 1945, Legrand met Daniel Tinayre, a director of French origin. Legrand married Tinayre on 18 May 1946. They had two children, Daniel Andrés, born in 1947, and Marcela, born in 1950. Legrand and Tinayre were married until Tinayre's death in 1994. Tinayre had been diagnosed with hepatitis B in September 1994 and died a month later. Their son Daniel died from pancreatic cancer in 1999.

Selected filmography

Her cinematographic career spanned more than 25 years from 1939 to 1965. She participated in 36 films of Argentina and Spain, including:
 Educating Niní
 El viaje
 Un Beso en la Nuca 
 El espejo
 Cinco besos 
 El retrato
 La vendedora de fantasías
 Los martes, orquídeas (1941)

Awards

Nominations
 2013 Martín Fierro Awards
 Best female TV host

References

External links 

 Mirtha Legrand at cinenacional.com
 Biography of Mirtha Legrand

1927 births
Living people
20th-century Argentine actresses
People from General López Department
Argentine film actresses
Argentine radio actresses
Argentine stage actresses
Argentine television actresses
Illustrious Citizens of Buenos Aires
Golden Martín Fierro Award winners
Argentine twins
Argentine people of Spanish descent